Hodonice is the name of several locations in the Czech Republic:

 Hodonice (Tábor District), a village in the South Bohemian Region
 Hodonice (Znojmo District), a village in the South Moravian Region